The All-EuroLeague Team is an award for Europe's premier level league, the EuroLeague, that is given to the league's top ten basketball players for each season, since the 2000–01 season. During the FIBA era of the EuroLeague, players were honored first by being a part of the FIBA Festival, and later by being selected to the FIBA EuroStars. Under FIBA, the EuroLeague also originally featured a EuroLeague Final Four Team selection, which was a forerunner of the All-EuroLeague Team award, and which consisted of the five best players of the EuroLeague Final Four.

In a year in which European professional club basketball was divided between the Euroleague Basketball-organized 2000–01 EuroLeague, and the FIBA-organized 2000–01 FIBA SuproLeague, it was the Euroleague Basketball organized competition that selected the inaugural All-EuroLeague Team.

Within the inaugural team, only Rashard Griffith of Virtus Bologna had reached the competition's semifinals with his team, and only one other player, Fortitudo Bologna's Gregor Fučka, made it to the competition's quarterfinals with his. With the exception of that original All-EuroLeague Team selection, team success has been capital for a player to achieve All-EuroLeague status, in the great majority of cases. The priority of the team success criteria, as a part of the media member's voting, was unofficially established, after the merger of Euroleague Basketball's EuroLeague, and FIBA Europe's FIBA SuproLeague, at the end of the 2000–01 season.

Voting criteria
Team success, and not individual stats, is the paramount criteria in the selection process. Each season's All-EuroLeague Team consists of ten players total, with five players chosen for both the First and Second Team.

In the selection process, through the 2010–11 EuroLeague season, each voter had to choose 2 point guards, 4 shooting guards and/or small forwards, and 4 power forwards and/or centers. The players were listed by the positions that the EuroLeague deemed to place them at for the voting process, even though in some cases, this may not have properly reflected what position the player usually played at, nor reflect if some players often played at multiple positions.

Since the 2011–12 EuroLeague season, voting is no longer limited by position, as 5 players are picked by both the fan and media voters, regardless of their positions. This change was made to give voters the opportunity to choose any players they want for the team, rather than limiting them to choices based on positions. Online fan voting accounts for 25% of the vote total, while media voting for the remaining 75%.

The online fan vote for the All-EuroLeague Team is collected through online voting at the EuroLeague's official website, which allows for one vote every 24 hours from each individual IP address. The player that receives the most online fan votes for the All-EuroLeague Team, also receives the full 25% of the fan's vote for the EuroLeague MVP choice.

All-EuroLeague Team by season

All-EuroLeague Team when the voting was by position

Player nationalities by national team.

† A tie resulted in the voting for the best point guard of the 2006–07 season between Dimitris Diamantidis and Theo Papaloukas. Consequently, the All-EuroLeague First Team included six players that season.

All-EuroLeague Team since the voting has not been by position

Player nationalities by national team.

Notes:
 There was no awarding in the 2019–20, because the season was cancelled due to the coronavirus pandemic in Europe.

Players with multiple All-EuroLeague Team selections
Players are listed by the nationality that they are registered under in their national domestic leagues, being the one the EuroLeague officially considers. The following table only lists players with at least two total selections.
Player nationalities by national team.

See also 
EuroLeague Final Four Team
FIBA Festival
FIBA EuroStars
EuroLeague Awards
50 Greatest Euroleague Contributors
Euroleague Basketball 2001–10 All-Decade Team

References

External links
 EuroLeague Official Web Page
 InterBasket EuroLeague Basketball Forum
 TalkBasket EuroLeague Basketball Forum
 

EuroLeague statistics
EuroLeague awards and honors